The Lymantriinae (formerly called the Lymantriidae) are a subfamily of moths of the family Erebidae. The taxon was erected by George Hampson in 1893.

Many of its component species are referred to as "tussock moths" of one sort or another. The caterpillar, or larval, stage of these species often has a distinctive appearance of alternating bristles and haired projections. Many tussock moth caterpillars have urticating hairs (often hidden among longer, softer hairs), which can cause painful reactions if they come into contact with skin.

The subfamily Lymantriinae includes about 350 known genera and over 2,500 known species found in every continent except Antarctica. They are particularly concentrated in sub-Saharan Africa, India, Southeast Asia, and South America. One estimate lists 258 species in Madagascar alone. Apart from oceanic islands, notable places that do not host lymantriines include the Antilles and New Caledonia.

Description

Adult moths of this subfamily do not feed. They usually have muted colours (browns and greys), although some are white, and tend to be very hairy. Some females are flightless, and some have reduced wings. Usually, the females have a large tuft at the end of the abdomen. The males, at least, have tympanal organs. They are mostly nocturnal, but Schaefer lists 20 confirmed diurnal species and 20 more likely diurnal species (based on reduced eye size).

The larvae are also hairy, often with hairs packed in tufts, and in many species the hairs break off very easily and are extremely irritating to the skin (especially members of the genus Euproctis). This highly effective defence serves the moth throughout its life cycle. The hairs are incorporated into the cocoon. An emerging adult female of some species collects and stores the hairs at the tip of the abdomen and uses them to camouflage and protect the eggs as they are laid. In other species, the eggs are covered by a froth that soon hardens or are camouflaged by material the female collects and sticks to them. In the larvae of some species, hairs are gathered in dense tufts along the back and this gives them the common name of tussocks or tussock moths.

Lymantria means "destroyer", and several species are important defoliators of forest trees, including the spongy moth Lymantria dispar, the Douglas-fir tussock moth Orgyia pseudotsugata, and the nun moth Lymantria monacha. They tend to have broader host plant ranges than most Lepidoptera. Most feed on trees and shrubs, but some are known from vines, herbs, grasses, and lichens.

Tribes
Most genera are classified into the following tribes, while others remain unclassified (incertae sedis):
Arctornithini
Daplasini
Leucomini
Locharnini
Lymantriini
Orgyiini
Nygmiini
Incertae sedis

See also the list of Lymantriinae genera.

Systematics

Taxonomy is a dynamic discipline, and recent phylogenetic studies have reclassified the family Lymantriidae as the subfamily Lymantriinae of the newly formed family Erebidae. The studies found that the family Lymantriidae form a specialized lineage within the Erebidae and is part of a clade that includes the litter moths (Herminiinae), the Aganainae, and the tiger and lichen moths (Arctiinae).  The reclassification affected the former family as a whole and largely kept the clade intact.  

This description clarifies the standing of the former name "Lymantriidae" relative to other proposed names, e.g. Liparidae and other currently unacceptable alternatives. It authoritatively explains the status of the family name Lymantriidae and its various alternatives as matters stood towards the end of the 20th century:

In the 1980 The Generic Names of Moths of the World: Volume 2, Allen Watson, D. S. Fletcher and I. W. B. Nye wrote:

As pointed out, "Liparidae" once was an alternative family name for the Lymantriidae, but nowadays "Liparidae" is firmly established as the name of a family of fish, and according to the conventions of zoological taxonomy, family names have to be unique, even though they are permitted to coincide with botanical names.

Notable species and genera
Brown-tail, Euproctis chrysorrhoea
Yellow-tail, Sphrageidus similis
Gypsy moth, Lymantria dispar
Nun moth, Lymantria monacha
Pale tussock moth, Calliteara pudibunda
Northern pine tussock moth, Dasychira plagiata
Arctic woollybear moth, Gynaephora groenlandica
Rusty tussock moth or vapourer, Orgyia antiqua
Western tussock moth, Orgyia vetusta
White-marked tussock moth, Orgyia leucostigma
Douglas-fir tussock moth, Orgyia pseudostugata
Satin moth, Leucoma salicis
Coca moth, Eloria noyesi
Painted apple moth, Teia anartoides
Rahona

Literary references
In The God of Small Things by Arundhati Roy, the character Pappachi discovers a new species of lymantriid with "unusually dense dorsal tufts". At first, his discovery is misclassified as a race of an existing species. After Pappachi retires from the post of imperial entomologist, a taxonomic revision makes his moth the type species of a new genus. Pappachi's original claim is forgotten and the new genus is named for a former subordinate. The disappointment embitters Pappachi:

References

Further reading

Schintlmeister, Alexander (2004). The Taxonomy of the Genus Lymantria Hubner, [1819] (Lepidoptera: Lymantriidae).

 
Moth subfamilies
Taxa named by George Hampson